Rajsko may refer to the following places:
Rajsko, Greater Poland Voivodeship (east-central Poland)
Rajsko, Brzesko County in Lesser Poland Voivodeship (south Poland)
Rajsko, Oświęcim County in Lesser Poland Voivodeship (south Poland)
Rajsko, part of the Swoszowice district of Kraków
Rajsko, Silesian Voivodeship (south Poland)
Rajsko, West Pomeranian Voivodeship (north-west Poland)